Mimela langbianica is a species of scarab beetle in the family Scarabaeidae.

Description 
They are leaf-green colored, and have a trapezoidal clypeus. Their elytra makes them similar to Anomala felicia.

Range 
They had been known to live in the Đà Lạt Plateau.

References 

Rutelinae
Insects of Vietnam